Janet Brennan Croft (born 1961) is an American librarian and Tolkien scholar, known for her authored and edited books and journals on J. R. R. Tolkien's Middle-earth fantasy.

Academic career
Croft earned a Bachelor of Arts in English and Classical Civilization (double major) from Indiana University in 1982 and graduated as a Master of Library Science in 1983 at the Indiana University School of Library and Information. She has worked at the Carnegie Library of Pittsburgh and has been director and associate professor at Warden Memorial Library, Martin Methodist College. She became the Head of Access Services at Bizzell Memorial Library, University of Oklahoma, in 2001 and was given associate professorship in 2007. In September 2014 she started as Head, Access and Delivery Services at Rutgers University Libraries. and as of July 1, 2018, her title changed to Liaison to the School of Communication and Information and Librarian for Copyright and Disability Services. In August 2020 she became Associate University Librarian for Content Discovery at the University of Northern Iowa. Her research interests focus on copyright laws concerning libraries and the work of J. R. R. Tolkien and other fantasy authors. This includes several academic lectures on Tolkien that she has held at University of Oklahoma.

Since 2006 she has been the editor of Mythlore, a peer-reviewed academic journal published by the Mythopoeic Society. Among general publications on mythology and fantasy, it focuses on the three most prominent members of the Inklings: J. R. R. Tolkien, C. S. Lewis, and Charles Williams. She is credited as "Tolkien Scholar" in Peter Jackson's The Hobbit: An Unexpected Journey.

Selected publications

On library science
 The book has been reviewed as valuable guide for academic libraries.

On Tolkien
  In this book, Croft draws parallels between Tolkien's traumatic experiences as a soldier in World War I and the events and characters of his legendarium.
 In a 2006 review, film theorist Kristin Thompson was critical about the fact that film studies were undertaken by literary researchers and about the frequent denigration of Jackson's work in the collected essays.

 An essay on the various pre-Peter Jackson scripts for The Lord of the Rings.

References

American legal writers
Library science scholars
Tolkien studies
1961 births
Living people